Voima may refer to:

Transport
 Two Finnish icebreakers:
 Voima (1924)
 Voima (1952)

Publications
 Voima (newspaper), Finnish newspaper
 Nuori Voima, Finnish magazine published by Nuoren Voiman Liitto
 Pohjan Voima, newspaper of the Lapua Movement

Companies
 Imatran Voima a Finnish state-owned power company, now part of Fortum
 Pohjolan Voima, a Finnish power company
 Teollisuuden Voima, a Finnish power company

Others
 Imatran Voima (band), a Finnish electro music duo
 Voima (book), a fantasy fiction novel by C. Dale Brittain